The 2012 Hungarian Figure Skating Championships took place on 10 February 2012 at the Budapesti Gyakorló Jégpálya in Budapest. Skaters competed in the disciplines of men's singles, ladies' singles, and ice dancing on the senior, junior, and novice levels. The results were used to choose the Hungarian teams to the 2012 World Championships and the 2012 European Championships.

Senior results

Men

Ladies

Ice dancing

External links
 results

Hungarian Figure Skating Championships
Hungarian Figure Skating Championships, 2012
2012 in Hungarian sport